Crown and Andrews is a game manufacturer in Australia and the UK. It makes board games, educational games, wooden puzzles, Rubiks puzzles and jigsaw puzzles.

TV shows board games
Crown and Andrews has made many board games licensed from TV shows, some of them are listed below:
Deal or No Deal
Bert's Family Feud 
Wheel of Fortune 
The Price is Right 
Sale of the Century/Temptation 
Neighbours 
Now You See It
Who Wants to be a Millionaire 
The Biggest Loser
The Chase Australia

Games for children
Robodoc
Sharky's Dinners
Hoppit!
The Frog Prince Game
The Tooth Fairy Game
Balance the Bone Game
Itsy Bitsy Spider
Children's Charades
Naughty Dogs
Fairytale Charms Game
Breakfast Cereal Monopoly
Choose That Song
Teddy Tells Game
Bunny Hop
Woof Woof Game
Swat That Fly
Pass The Parcel
Sshh! Don't Wake Dad!
Match 2
Hedbanz for Kids
Dinosaurs
Rumble in the Jungle
Musical Chairs
Super Cricket
Test Match Cricket
Crunching Crocodile
Shop´ Til You Drop
Snakes and Ladders
Pig Goes Pop!
Hot Potato

External links
 The Crown and Andrews website

Game manufacturers
Jigsaw puzzle manufacturers